Paul Neville may refer to:

Paul Neville (politician) (1940–2019), Australian politician
Paul Neville (musician), British industrial metal guitarist
Paul Neville (actor) in Full Speed Ahead